Cineworld Glasgow Renfrew Street is a cinema on Renfrew Street, Glasgow, located in the north-east of the city centre. It is adjacent to Buchanan Bus Station and the Glasgow Royal Concert Hall, as well as being close to Sauchiehall Street and Buchanan Galleries.

By 2003 it was the busiest cinema in the United Kingdom by admissions, having attracted over 1.8 million patrons that year. Cineworld Glasgow has 18 screens over 6 levels, and can accommodate more than 4,300 people. Its most distinctive feature is the huge glass curtain wall on the east face, which houses a system of criss-crossing escalators which are lit neon blue at night.

History

The cinema was built on the site of The Glasgow Apollo (1973–1985), which was formerly Green's Playhouse (1927–1973). After the Apollo closed in June 1985, it was demolished in September 1987. The cinema was opened as the UGC Cinema in September 2001. In 2005, it became part of the Cineworld chain, when then-owners UGC sold all of its UK cinemas. Green's Playhouse, the original cinema on the site, previously held a record for being Europe's largest cinema in terms of number of seats (4,368). At over 60 m (200 ft) high, and with an entry in the Guinness Book of Records, Cineworld Glasgow is the world's tallest cinema. However, during the cinema's construction, the building design came under heavy criticism from the architecture community.

The building was designated the "Carbuncle of the Year" in an internet vote organised by Prospect magazine, its panel of judges criticising the design's contrast with the surrounding area.

See also
 List of tallest buildings in Glasgow

References

External links 

 Cineworld Glasgow - Renfrew Street cinema page
 Cineworld Cinemas UK, current chain site

Cinemas in Glasgow
Theatres completed in 2001
2001 establishments in Scotland